Roger Eugene Bureau (1 February 1905 – c. 11 April 1945) was a Belgian speed skater and ice hockey player. As a speed skater he finished seventh at the 1926 European Championships. As a hockey player he won a silver medal at the Ice Hockey European Championship 1927, and finished fifth and 13th at the 1928 and 1936 Winter Olympics, respectively. During World War II Bureau served with the Allied forces. On 21 April 1944 he was arrested near the French-Spanish border, placed in a German prison camp, and executed in April 1945.

References

External links
 Olympic ice hockey tournaments 1928+1936 

1905 births
1945 deaths
Belgian ice hockey defencemen
Belgian military personnel killed in World War II
Ice hockey players at the 1928 Winter Olympics
Ice hockey players at the 1936 Winter Olympics
Olympic ice hockey players of Belgium
Belgian people executed by Nazi Germany
Belgian prisoners of war in World War II
World War II prisoners of war held by Germany
Sportspeople from Antwerp
Belgian male speed skaters